Hugh Dean McLellan (September 10, 1876 – June 20, 1953) was a United States district judge of the United States District Court for the District of Massachusetts.

Education and career

Born in Belfast, Maine, McLellan received an Artium Baccalaureus degree from Colby College in 1895 and a Bachelor of Laws from Columbia Law School in 1902. He was in private practice in Boston, Massachusetts from 1902 to 1932. He was a lecturer for Boston University Law School from 1929 to 1938. He was a lecturer for Harvard Law School from 1935 to 1942.

Federal judicial service

McLellan was nominated by President Herbert Hoover on January 18, 1932, to a seat on the United States District Court for the District of Massachusetts vacated by Judge James Madison Morton Jr. He was confirmed by the United States Senate on February 3, 1932, and received his commission on February 10, 1932. McLellan resigned on September 30, 1941.

Later career and death

After his resignation from the federal bench, McLellan resumed private practice in Boston from 1941 to 1953. He died in Brookline, Massachusetts, on June 20, 1953.

References

Sources
 

1876 births
1953 deaths
People from Brookline, Massachusetts
Colby College alumni
Columbia Law School alumni
Harvard Law School faculty
Judges of the United States District Court for the District of Massachusetts
United States district court judges appointed by Herbert Hoover
20th-century American judges
People from Belfast, Maine